The 2019 Case Western Reserve Spartans football team represented Case Western Reserve University as a member of the Presidents' Athletic Conference (PAC) during the 2019 NCAA Division III football season.  The team was coached by 16th-year coach Greg Debeljak and played its home games at DiSanto Field.

Schedule

References

Case Western Reserve
Case Western Reserve Spartans football seasons
Case Western Reserve Spartans football